Dr. Lucinda A. McDade (born 3 December 1953) is an American botanist and plant collector who is noted for her study of Acanthaceae and her work in conservation biology.  She received her B.S. in Biology from Newcomb College of Tulane University, and her Ph.D. in Botany/Zoology from Duke University.

She has been president of the American Society of Plant Taxonomists and Association of Tropical Biology. In 2019 she was awarded the Asa Gray Award by the American Society of Plant Taxonomists.

She has described at least sixteen species, and has gathered around 600 specimens, many from Central and South America.

Works

References 

1953 births
Living people
American women botanists
20th-century American botanists
20th-century American women scientists
21st-century American botanists
21st-century American women scientists
Tulane University alumni
Duke University alumni